The Cathedral of the Holy Trinity is a Serbian Orthodox cathedral church in Mostar, Bosnia and Herzegovina. 

It served as the seat of the Eparchy of Zahumlje and Herzegovina from 1873 until its destruction during the siege of Mostar in 1992. The church was the work of the prominent architect Andrey Damyanov. It was built between 1863 and 1873. It has been under reconstruction since 2011.

Ever since the reconstruction, the church was targeted by vandals and thieves motivated by prejudice and hostility.

Gallery

See also 
 Serbs in Mostar
 Eparchy of Zahumlje and Herzegovina
 Žitomislić Monastery

References

External links 
Official website (in Serbian)

Buildings and structures in Mostar
Serbian Orthodox church buildings in Bosnia and Herzegovina
Churches completed in 1873
Destroyed churches in Bosnia and Herzegovina
Serbian Orthodox cathedrals in Bosnia and Herzegovina